Chezidek (born Desbert Johnson, 1973, Saint Ann Parish, Jamaica) is a roots reggae singer. He is known for his hit singles, "Call Pon Dem" (featured in Grand Theft Auto IV), "Can't Hear Must Feel", "Inna Di Road", and "Leave De Trees".

Biography
Chezidek started singing from an early age at school concerts, and was a member of St. Ann's Bay Marching Band. After finishing school he performed on sound systems in the area, as Chilla Rinch, singing and DJing at various dance and talent shows.

He left St. Ann's Bay for Kingston where he linked up with record producer Philip "Fatis" Burrell from Xterminator Production. He recorded his first album in 2002, entitled Harvest Time (distributed by VP Records), with popular tracks such as "Can't Hear Must Feel", "Breakfree" and the title track "Harvest Time".

His first number one hit single "Leave De Trees" on the Our Promotion label, produced by Hugh Miller (aka Bunny Dan) went on BBC Top 10 dancehall chart. Since then he has performed on major events such as Magnum Sting, Teen Splash, Dancehall Jam Jam, Bob Marley Tribute, and Tribute to Peter Tosh, Rebel Salute and Western Consciousness. He was awarded best new artiste by the Jamaica Federation of Music and Affiliated Artiste (JFM) for Middlesex (County).

Chezidek's album Inna Di Road was produced by Bobby "Massive B" Konders and distributed by Greensleeves Records in September 2007. "Call Pon Dem" as well as covers of "Mi Nah Run" from his album Inna Di Road is featured on the fictional radio station Massive B Sound system in Grand Theft Auto IV.

Discography

References

External links
 chezidekreggae.com

1973 births
Living people
Jamaican male singers
Jamaican reggae singers
Converts to the Rastafari movement
Jamaican Rastafarians
Performers of Rastafarian music
People from Saint Ann Parish
VP Records artists
Greensleeves Records artists